This is a list of Iraqi Information Ministers during the presidency of Saddam Hussein.  The ministry was dissolved in May 2003 by L. Paul Bremer under CPA Order Number 2.

Ba'athist Iraq (1968–2003)

References

Lists of government ministers of Iraq
Information Ministers
Government ministers of Iraq
Iraq